= Cemal Esener =

Turkish politician

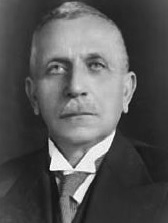

Member of the Grand National Assembly

Personal details
- Born: 1876 Constantinople, Ottoman Empire
- Died: 1958 (aged 81–82)

Cemal Esener (1876–1958) was a Turkish general and politician.
